The 1983 Tour de France was the 70th edition of the Tour de France, run from 1 to 24 July, with 22 stages and a prologue covering a total distance of  The race was won by French rider Laurent Fignon. Sean Kelly of Ireland won the points classification, and Lucien Van Impe of Belgium won the mountains classification.

Teams

The Tour organisation wanted to globalize cycling by having cyclist from the Eastern Bloc in the Tour. Because they only rode as amateurs, the 1983 Tour was also opened for amateur teams. In the end, only the Colombian and Portuguese national amateur teams applied for a place, and the Portuguese team later withdrew. The 1983 Tour started with 140 cyclists, divided into 14 teams of 10 cyclists.

The teams entering the race were:

Route and stages

The 1983 Tour de France started on 1 July, and had one rest day, after the finish on the Alpe d'Huez.

Race overview

In 1983, Fignon was a part of the team that helped Bernard Hinault to win the 1983 Vuelta a España. Guimard did not want to send Fignon to the Tour de France, because two Grand Tours could be too much for a 22-year-old rider. When Hinault, winner of four of five previous Tours, announced that he would not start due to injury, the Renault team was without a team captain. Fignon was added to the 1983 Tour de France selection for the Renault team, and the team decided to go for stage wins, with hopes of having Fignon or Marc Madiot compete for the young rider classification. After stage nine, the first mountain stage, Fignon was in second place, behind Pascal Simon, and he was allowed to be team leader. In the eleventh stage, Simon crashed and broke his shoulder blade. Simon continued, and only lost little time the next stages. In the fifteenth stage, a mountain time trial, Fignon was able to win back so much time that he was within one minute of Simon.

In the seventeenth stage, Simon had to give up, and Fignon became the new leader. In the next stages, Fignon was able to answer all attacks from his opponents, and he even won the time trial in the 21st stage. At 22 years old, Fignon was the youngest man to win the Tour since 1933.

Fignon later said that he was lucky to have won the 1983 Tour: if Hinault would have been present, Fignon would have helped Hinault, as Hinault was the team leader.

Classification leadership and minor prizes

There were several classifications in the 1983 Tour de France, four of them awarding jerseys to their leaders. The most important was the general classification, calculated by adding each cyclist's finishing times on each stage. The cyclist with the least accumulated time was the race leader, identified by the yellow jersey; the winner of this classification is considered the winner of the Tour.

Additionally, there was a points classification, where cyclists got points for finishing among the best in a stage finish, or in intermediate sprints. The cyclist with the most points lead the classification, and was identified with a green jersey.

There was also a mountains classification. The organisation had categorised some climbs as either hors catégorie, first, second, third, or fourth-category; points for this classification were won by the first cyclists that reached the top of these climbs first, with more points available for the higher-categorised climbs. The cyclist with the most points lead the classification, and wore a white jersey with red polka dots.

Another classification was the young rider classification. This was decided the same way as the general classification, but only riders that rode the Tour for the first time were eligible, and the leader wore a white jersey.

The fifth individual classification was the intermediate sprints classification. This classification had similar rules as the points classification, but only points were awarded on intermediate sprints. In 1983, this classification had no associated jersey.

The team classification changed; in 1982 it was calculated with the times of the best four cyclists in every stage, and in 1983 this changed to the times of the best three cyclists. The riders in the team that led this classification were identified by yellow caps. There was also a team points classification. Cyclists received points according to their finishing position on each stage, with the first rider receiving one point. The first three finishers of each team had their points combined, and the team with the fewest points led the classification. The riders of the team leading this classification wore green caps.

In addition, there was a combativity award given after each mass-start stage to the cyclist considered most combative. The decision was made by a jury composed of journalists who gave points. The cyclist with the most points from votes in all stages led the combativity classification. Serge Demierre won this classification, and was given overall the super-combativity award. The Souvenir Henri Desgrange was given in honour of Tour founder Henri Desgrange to the first rider to pass the summit of the Col du Tourmalet on stage 10. This prize was won by José Patrocinio Jiménez.

Final standings

General classification

Points classification

Mountains classification

Young rider classification

Combination classification

Intermediate sprints classification

Team classification

Team points classification

Combativity classification

References

Bibliography

External links

 
1983 in road cycling
Tour de France
Tour de France by year
Tour de France
1983 Super Prestige Pernod